The St. Maries 1910 Fire Memorial, at St. Maries Cemetery in St. Maries, Idaho, was listed on the National Register of Historic Places in 1984.

A six-foot granite slab memorial, with a  United States Forest Service bronze plate, was erected in 1924.
The site includes graves of 54 fire fighters lost on August 20, 1910.  Also 28 fire victims at Big Creek and 26 at Setzer Creek, killed in 1912, were reburied to the memorial.

References

External links

Firefighting memorials		
National Register of Historic Places in Benewah County, Idaho
Buildings and structures completed in 1910